Tripalmitin is a triglyceride derived from the fatty acid palmitic acid.

References

Triglycerides
Palmitate esters